The 2014 North Hertfordshire Council election was held on 22 May 2014, at the same time as other local elections and the European Parliament election. Of the 49 seats on North Hertfordshire District Council, 18 were up for election.

The Conservatives increased their majority on the council. Labour also increased their number of seats, whilst the Liberal Democrats lost both of the seats they were defending at this election.

Overall results
The overall results were as follows:

Ward results
The results for each ward were as follows. Where the previous incumbent was standing for re-election they are marked with an asterisk(*). A double dagger(‡) indicates a sitting councillor contesting a different ward.

The election in Hitchwood, Offa and Hoo ward was delayed due to the death of one of the original candidates.

Robert Inwood had been elected as a Liberal Democrat in 2010, but had defected to Labour in 2012.

References

2014 English local elections
2014
2010s in Hertfordshire